HTTP File Server, otherwise known as HFS, is a free web server specifically designed for publishing and sharing files.
The complete feature set differs from other web servers; it lacks some common features, like CGI, or even ability to run as a Windows service, but includes, for example, counting file downloads. It is even advised against using it as an ordinary web server.

Features 
HFS is a small HTTP file server, aimed at mostly sharing files for download.
The official documentation describes HFS as:
HFS (HTTP File Server) is file sharing software which allows you to send and receive files. You can limit this sharing to just a few friends, or be open to the whole world.

HFS is different from classic file sharing because there is no network. HFS is a web server which uses web technology to be more compatible with today's Internet.

Since it is actually a web server, your friends can download files as if they were downloading from a website using a web browser, such as Internet Explorer or Firefox. Your users don't have to install any new software.

HFS lets you share your files. Most web servers are used to publish a website, but HFS is not designed to do that. You are, however, free to use it in any way you wish, - but at your own risk. 

As of the latest beta version 2.3, HFS includes its own proprietary scripting language known as "macros", which can be used to expand functionality of the program. Scripts can be used in a variety of methods including event handlers and directly on web pages. Macros can even be written to bypass the program's account system with a custom one. HFS can be used as a typical web-server, however it is not easy to support and requires a variety of unconventional programming methods (version 2.3 only), due to its lack of support for PHP or CGI.

History 
Development started in August 2002, and reached version 1.0 in September of the same year.

Security 
HFS has had multiple security issues in the past, but states on its website that as of 2013 "There are no current known security bugs in the latest version. HFS is open source, so anyone is able to easily check for security flaws (and we have many expert users). Although it was not designed to be extremely robust, HFS is very stable and has been used for months without a restart".

It can be used with Stunnel to provide https (SSL/TLS).

See also 
 Web server
 FTP/HTTP File Server

Footnotes

External links 
 
 HFS: Similar software
 HFS Introduction
 some of the prior security issues with HFS

Free web server software
Windows-only free software